Melvin Jermaine Booker (born August 20, 1972) is an American former professional basketball player. A ,  point guard, he played for the University of Missouri.

Amateur career
Booker was a standout high school player in Moss Point, Mississippi. He averaged 28 points per game in his senior year and was named the player of the year in his class. Despite that, none of the major four-year schools from the region recruited him. Booker signed with Missouri, a school whose attention he caught during a prior recruitment run through the area. Missouri assistant coaches noticed him while they were scouting fellow Mississippi standouts Litterial Green and Chris Jackson.

Booker was the 1994 Big Eight Player of the Year, when he led Missouri to an undefeated conference record of 14–0 and an Elite Eight berth. He was also an all Big Eight selection in 1993 and 1994 and was a 1994 first-team All-American as a senior, when he averaged 18.1 points and 4.5 assists per game. In 1999, Booker was elected to the intercollegiate athletics Hall of Fame at the University of Missouri.

Professional career
Despite his accomplishments, Booker was not selected in the 1994 NBA draft.

He played in the NBA for the Houston Rockets during the 1995–96 season; and the Denver Nuggets and Golden State Warriors, during the 1996–97 season, for 32 games.

Personal life
While playing for the Grand Rapids Mackers in the 1995–1996 CBA season, Booker met Veronica Gutiérrez. The two became close and had a son, Devin, who was born on October 30, 1996. The two never married and Gutiérrez would take care of their son Devin while his father played pro basketball in Europe and Asia. During the summers, Booker would bring his son to his games which helped to drive Devin's interest in basketball. After Melvin Booker retired from pro basketball in 2008, he returned to his hometown of Moss Point, Mississippi and brought his son with him so he could help train him to become a successful basketball player. Booker was hired as an assistant coach for basketball at his alma mater, Moss Point High School, in 2011.

His only child and son, Devin Booker, played for the University of Kentucky Wildcats basketball team during their nearly undefeated 2014–15 NCAA season and currently plays for the Phoenix Suns.

References

External links

1972 births
Living people
African-American basketball players
All-American college men's basketball players
American expatriate basketball people in Italy
American expatriate basketball people in Russia
American expatriate basketball people in Turkey
American men's basketball players
Basketball players from Mississippi
BC Khimki players
Denver Nuggets players
Golden State Warriors players
Grand Rapids Hoops players
Grand Rapids Mackers players
Houston Rockets players
Missouri Tigers men's basketball players
Olimpia Milano players
People from Pascagoula, Mississippi
Point guards
Ülker G.S.K. basketball players
Undrafted National Basketball Association players
Victoria Libertas Pallacanestro players
21st-century African-American sportspeople
20th-century African-American sportspeople